Hoppus On Music, previously titled A Different Spin with Mark Hoppus, is a talk show hosted by Blink-182 and +44 singer/bassist Mark Hoppus. The show premiered on September 16, 2010, on Fuse, and lasted until June 2012. The show formerly featured comedian Amy Schumer as the co-host.

Background
The show focused on music news, humorous panel discussions and special reports from the show's correspondents. The show also featured musical performances by both mainstream and emerging bands. On January 18, 2011, Mark Hoppus announced via Twitter, that the show was renamed to, Hoppus On Music.

The show’s first press release was on June 22, 2010. Mark Hoppus stated "I am stoked to join the Fuse family and have a show where I can talk about a topic that I'm passionate about, music. More importantly, I'm excited to force millions of people to watch me on a weekly basis on national television." According to Fuse senior vice president of programming and development Sal LoCurto, "A Different Spin with Mark Hoppus was developed to complement the wide variety of music programming on Fuse - including live concerts, festival coverage and in-depth interview series with the biggest names in music."

On August 5, 2010, Hoppus revealed the co-host of the show would be comedian Amy Schumer. There is often a regular panel, where they discuss hot topics on music, with such guests as Andrew WK regularly talking on it. On December 11, 2011, Hoppus welcomed bandmate Tom DeLonge's band Angels & Airwaves, on which Mark joked he "cheats" on him with.

List of episodes

See also
List of Fuse shows

References

External links 
 Amy Schumer
 Hoppus On Music
 Initial press release for the show

Fuse (TV channel) original programming
2010s American television talk shows
2010 American television series debuts
2012 American television series endings